Dielectric breakdown model (DBM) is a macroscopic mathematical model combining the diffusion-limited aggregation model with electric field. It was developed by Niemeyer, Pietronero, and Weismann in 1984. It describes the patterns of dielectric breakdown of solids, liquids, and even gases, explaining the formation of the branching, self-similar Lichtenberg figures.

See also 

 Eden growth model
 Lichtenberg figure
 Diffusion-limited aggregation

References

External links
 Dielectric Breakdown Model

Electricity
Mathematical modeling
Electrical breakdown